The 2016 GAA Interprovincial Championships (formerly known as the Railway Cups) was a senior GAA competition in which the four provinces of Ireland competed in Gaelic football and hurling. The provincial squads are made up of players from the county panels in each province.

Connacht were the reigning football champions whilst Leinster were the reigning hurling champions from 2014. Due to adverse weather conditions, the 2015 inter-provincials did not take place.

Ulster were the Football champions and Munster were the Hurling champions.

Football Championship

Football Managers

Ger O’Sullivan (Cork & Munster)
John Tobin (Galway & Connacht) 
Pete McGrath (Down & Ulster)
Seán Kelly (Meath & Leinster)

Football Semi-finals

Football final

Hurling Championship

Hurling Managers

Anthony Daly (Clare & Munster)
Micheál Donoghue (Galway & Connacht)
Terence McNaughton (Antrim & Ulster)
Ciarán Hetherton (Dublin & Leinster)

Hurling Semi-finals

Hurling final

References
 Results and fixtures

GAA Interprovincial Championship
I
I